Kyaiklat is a town in the Ayeyarwady Region of south-west Myanmar. It is the seat of the Kyaiklat Township in the Pyapon District.

Populated places in Ayeyarwady Region
Township capitals of Myanmar